Andreas "Anderl" Molterer (born 8 October 1931) is an Austrian former alpine skier. He was born in Kitzbühel.

At the 1956 Winter Olympics in Cortina d'Ampezzo, Italy he won silver in the giant slalom, and bronze in the downhill competition. In 1953, 1955, 1958, and 1959 he won the Hahnenkamm Race in Kitzbühel. There was no skiing world cup in these times, but Molterer would have won it 1953, 1955, 1956, and 1958. Molterer later emigrated to the United States. After running ski schools in Montana and Colorado, he settled in Tennessee.

References

External links
 Anderl Molterer at the Kitzbühel Ski Club
 

1931 births
Living people
Austrian male alpine skiers
Olympic alpine skiers of Austria
Olympic silver medalists for Austria
Olympic bronze medalists for Austria
Alpine skiers at the 1956 Winter Olympics
Alpine skiers at the 1960 Winter Olympics
Sportspeople from Tyrol (state)
Olympic medalists in alpine skiing
Medalists at the 1956 Winter Olympics
20th-century Austrian people
21st-century Austrian people